Harris Publications Inc. was an American special interest media company, operating over 75 brands with print, digital, mobile and live event platforms prior to its sale to Athlon Media in 2016.  It produced magazines that educate, entertain, inform and inspire. Subject matters spanned an array of interests including decorating, gardening, beauty, automotive, sports, outdoor living, history, tactical, entertainment and wellness. Harris' titles covered a variety of markets and focused on niche special interests, primarily in the United States.

Harris Comics (sold in 2010 to Dynamic Forces) published the former Warren Publishing character Vampirella for nearly two decades.  Harris sold additional magazine brands including the basketball magazine Slam in 1998, African-American women's lifestyle magazine Honey in 1999, Guitar World in 2003 and XXL in 2014. Athlon Media acquired Harris Publications' magazine brands and websites in 2016 including Harris Farmers Almanac, American Frontiersman, Flea Market Style, Real Gardens and Music Icons.

History 
Harris Publications was founded in 1977 by Stanley R. Harris, who had been in the magazine publishing business since the late 1960s. Harris's father William invented the Harris Press printing press.

One of Harris Publications' first successful and long-running titles was Guitar World, which it published beginning in 1980, before selling the property to Future US in 2003.  The company sold its music and millennial division including XXL to Townsquare Media in 2014.  XXL was one of the largest music sites focusing on hip-hop and urban culture.

On April 28, 2016, Harris Publications operations and its magazine brands and trademarks were acquired by Athlon Media. Athlon integrated many of Harris' brands into its Decorating & Gardening group and announced plans to further distribute Harris' content through its newspaper distribution resources.

Harris Comics 
In 1983, Harris acquired the assets of the defunct Warren Publishing, including their well-known horror magazines Creepy, Eerie, and Vampirella. Forming Harris Comics in 1985, Harris published a single issue of Creepy (#146), but legal murkiness and a 1999 lawsuit by Warren publisher James Warren resulted in his reacquisition of the rights to Creepy and sister publication Eerie.

In the early 1990s Harris Comics revived Vampirella, publishing Vampirella stories in various series and formats from 1991 to 2007. A number of  U.K. creators worked for Harris on its Vampirella titles, including Grant Morrison, Gary Frank, Mark Millar, John Smith, Ian Edginton, and Malachy Coney. In January 2007 Fangoria Comics made the announcement that the character Vampirella was now owned by Fangoria, however, in April Harris replied that this was not factual, and began publishing Vampirella Quarterly.

Harris Comics also published a number of non-Vampirella comics in the superhero and science fiction genres. The 2002–2003 imprint Anarchy Studio published manga comics featuring the characters Vampi and Xin. Harris Comics operated until 2008, and in March 2010 Dynamite Entertainment acquired the Vampirella property.

Titles

Automotive 
 Mopar Action
 Rides
 America's Best Big Trucks
 0-60

Beauty 
 Short Hair
 Celebrity Hairstyles
 Short Styles

Crafts 
 Fresh Quilts
 Room to Create

Comics 
 Creepy—published one issue of the former Warren Publishing title in 1985
 Cyberfrog (1996)—Ethan Van Sciver character acquired from Hall of Heroes
 Flux (1994–1995)—video games, comics, and music
 Harsh Realm (1994)
 The Rook (1995)—original Eerie character revamped by Harris
 Vampi (2000–2002)
 Vampirella (various titles, 1991–2008)—acquired from Warren Publishing
 Xin (2002–2003)

Decorating 
 Beach Cottages
 Country Collectibles
 Decorating Shortcuts
 Flea Market Style
 Organized Room by Room
 Romantic Country
 Storage Solutions
 Small Space Decorating

Dogs 
 Dog News—considered the bible of the conformation show industry
 D—D is the Annual Magazine of Dog News released to coincide with the Westminster Kennel Club Dog Show

Entertainment 
 Style Makers
 Hollywood Icons
 Music Icons

Gardening 
 Container Gardening
 Fleas Market Gardens
 Great Backyards
 Porches and Gardens
 Real Gardens

Music 
 Guitar World (1980 – 2003) — acquired by Future US
 Revolver (2000–2003) — acquired by Future US
 Scratch (2004–2007)
 XXL (1997 – 2014) - acquired by Townsquare Media
 elektro 2012-2014, acquired by Townsquare Media

Outdoor living 
 The New Pioneer
 Harris' Farmer's Almanac
 America Frontiersman

Sports 
 Pro Football Draft
 College Football Guide
 Basketball Draft
 SLAM Magazine—acquired by Peterson Publishing in 1998

Guns and weapons
 Ballistic
 Combat Handguns
 Guns & Weapons for Law Enforcement
 Guns of the Old West
 Tactical Weapons
 Personal & Home Defense (published bi-annually)
 Special Weapons for Military & Police
 Survivor's Edge
 Tactical Knives
  Tactical Life

Guns (annual) 

 Gun Buyers Guide—2012, 2014 & 2015
 The Complete Book of Guns—2015
 The Complete Book of Handguns—2012 through 2015
 Gun Annual—2014
 The Complete Rifleman—1989 through 2011

Wellness 
 Naturally, Danny Seo
 Herbal Remedies

Miscellaneous 
 PC How-To Guide
 Woman—acquired by Condé Nast Publications in 1988
 ANTENNA
Honey acquired by Vanguarde Media in 1999

Notes

References

 
 
 Dean, Michael. "The Vampirella Wars: The Untold Story of James Warren's Custody Battle with Harris Comics" (excerpt), The Comics Journal #253, June 2003. Archive of original. WebCitation archive.

External links 
 

 
Comic book publishing companies of the United States
Defunct comics and manga publishing companies